Merwin or Merwyn may refer to:

People
Merwin (name), or Merwyn, a surname and masculine given name
W.S. Merwin (1927–2019), American poet.

Places
United States
Merwin Dam, a hydroelectric dam in the state of Washington
Lake Merwin, the reservoir formed by the dam
Merwin, Missouri, a village
Merwin House, Stockbridge, Massachusetts, currently a museum

See also
Mervin (disambiguation)
Mervyn, related name